Haeundae station is a station on the Busan Metro Line 2 in U-dong, Haeundae District, Busan, South Korea. The station is unrelated to the Sinhaeundae station operated by Korail.

References

External links
  Cyber station information from Busan Transportation Corporation

Busan Metro stations
Haeundae District
Railway stations opened in 2002
2002 establishments in South Korea